Complete list of the 108 Lower Canadians prosecuted before the general court-martial of Montreal in 1838-1839. The trials occurred between December 6, 1838 and 1 May 1839, following the suspension of habeas corpus on November 8, 1838. Nine of the persons in custody were acquitted, and 99 sentenced to death. 12 patriots were hanged in public between December 1838 and February 1839. 58 of the 99 who were initially condemned to death saw their sentence commuted into deportation to Australia on September 27, 1839. (Pardoned in 1843, they returned home in 1845.) 29 were freed under bail or condition.

The 58 deported to Australia

Saint-Clément
Michel Alary - carpenter
Désiré Bourbonnais - blacksmith
Jacques Goyette - farmer and stone man
Joseph Goyette - carpenter
André Papineau dit Montigny - blacksmith
François-Xavier Prévost - merchant and innkeeper
Toussaint Rochon - teamster and painter
Basile Roy - farmer
Charles Roy dit Lapensée père - farmer
Joseph Roy dit Lapensée, son of Louis - day labourer

L'Acadie
Théodore Béchard - owner
Antoine Coupal dit Lareine - farmer
Etienne Langlois - farmer

Sainte-Martine 
Charles Bergevin dit Langevin, père - farmer
Constant Buisson - blacksmith and bailiff
Ignace-Gabriel Chèvrefils - farmer
Joseph Dumouchel, - farmer - brother of Louis
Louis Dumouchel - innkeeper and cultivator
Jean Laberge - farmer and carpenter
François-Xavier Touchette - farmer and blacksmith
Louis Turcot - farmer

Napierville
François Bigonesse dit Beaucaire - owner
Louis Defaillette - farmer
Jacques-David Hébert - farmer
Joseph-Jacques Hébert - farmer
Charles Huot - notary
Pierre Lavoie - farmer
David-Drossin Leblanc - farmer
Hubert Drossin-Leblanc - farmer
Joseph Marceau dit Petit-Jacques - farmer and cloth weaver
Gabriel-Achille Morin - merchant (son of Pierre-Hector)
Pierre-Hector Morin - ship captain
Joseph Paré - farmer

Terrebonne
Charles-Guillaume Bouc - clerk
Edouard-Pascal Rochon - teamster and painter

Saint-Césaire
Louis Bourdon - farmer and merchant
Jean-Baptiste Bousquet - farmer and grain miller
François Guertin - carpenter

Montréal
Léandre Ducharme, clerk

Saint-Timothée

 David Gagnon - farmer and carpenter
 François-Xavier Prieur - merchant

Châteauguay
Louis-Guérin Dussault - merchant and baker
Joseph Guimond - farmer and carpenter
François-Maurice Lepailleur - painter
Samuel Newcomb - Médecin
Jean-Louis Thibert - farmer
Jean-Marie Thibert - farmer
Jean-Baptiste Trudelle - farmer and carpenter

Saint-Rémi
Hippolyte Lanctôt - notary
Louis Pinsonnault - farmer

Saint-Constant
Etienne Languedoc - farmer
Moyse Longtin, fils de Jacques - farmer

Saint-Philippe
Pascal Pinsonnault - farmer

Saint-Edouard
René Pinsonnault - farmer
Théophile Robert - farmer

Saint-Vincent-de-Paul
Jérémie Rochon - machine operator

Alburg, Vermont
Benjamin Mott - farmer

The 26 released under bail 
 François Camyré
 Antoine Charbonneau
 Joseph Cousineau
 David Demers
 Paul Gravelle
 Louis Héneault
 Louis Julien
 Joseph L'Écuyer
 Michel Longtin dit Jérôme, son
 Léon Leclaire
 Charles Mondat
 Clovis Patenaude
 Charles Rapin
 Antoine Roussin, alias Joseph
 Joseph Roy
 François St-Louis
 Thomas Surprenant, dit Lafontaine
 François Surprenant
 François Trepanier, son
 Édouard Tremblay
 Phillippe Tremblay
 François Vallé
 Bennoni Verdon
 Joseph Wattier dit Lanoie

The 12 hanged 
December 21, 1838
Joseph-Narcisse Cardinal, lawyer and Member of Parliament
Joseph Duquet, notary
January 18, 1839
Pierre-Théophile Decoigne, hotelman and notary
François-Xavier Hamelin, farmer
Joseph-Jacques Robert, farmer
Ambroise Sanguinet, farmer
Charles Sanguinet, farmer
February 15, 1839
Amable Daunais, fermier
François-Marie-Thomas Chevalier de Lorimier, notary
Charles Hindelang, merchant and military officer
Pierre-Rémi Narbonne, painter and bailiff
François Nicolas, teacher

The nine acquitted 
 Jean-Baptiste Dozois, father
 Antoine Doré
 Louis Lesiege, aka Lesage
 Louis Lemelin
 Joseph Longtin
 James Perrigo
 Jacques Robert
 Édouard Therien
 Isidore Tremblay

The three freed on condition 
 Jean-Baptiste-Henri Brien (remain at a distance of 600 miles from the province)
 Antoine Côté (remain within the province)
 Guillaume Lévesque (leave the province)

Notes

References 
 Faubert, Michel (2003). Liste des patriotes prisonniers (list of some 1366 persons detained during the period 1837-1840)
 Messier, Alain (2002). Dictionnaire encyclopédique et historique des patriotes. 1837-1838, Montréal: Guérin, 497 p.
 Boyer, Raymond (1966). Les crimes et les châtiments au Canada français du XVIIe au XXe siècle, Montréal: le Cercle du livre de France, 542 p. 
 Borthwick, John Douglas (1866). History of the Montreal prison from A.D. 1784 to A.D. 1886 : containing a complete record of the Troubles of 1837-1838, burning of the Parliament buildings in 1849, the St. Alban's raiders, 1864, the two Fenian raids of 1866 and 1870 [...], Montreal: A. Periard, bookseller, publisher and importer, 269 p.
 Colborne, John (1839). Report of the State Trials, Before a General Court Martial Held at Montreal in 1838-9: Exhibiting a Complete History of the Late Rebellion in Lower Canada, Montreal: Armour and Ramsay, (online: volume 1, volume 2)

External links
BANQ, Copies des sentences de mort prononcées contre Joseph Robert,Ambroise Sanguinet,Charles Sanguinet,Pascal Pinsonnault,François-Xavier Hamelin, Théophile Robert et Jacques Longtin

People prosecuted before the general court-martial of Montreal in 1838-39
Lower Canadians prosecuted before the general court-martial of Montreal in 1838-39
Lower Canadians prosecuted before the general court-martial of Montreal in 1838-39
Lower Canadians prosecuted before the general court-martial of Montreal in 1838-39
Lower Canadians prosecuted before the general court-martial of Montreal in 1838-39